Microcausta ignifimbrialis is a moth in the family Crambidae. It was described by George Hampson in 1895. It is found on Saint Vincent in the Caribbean.

References

Diptychophorini
Moths described in 1895